The General Elderly Alliance (in Dutch: Algemeen Ouderen Verbond, AOV) was a Dutch pensioners' political party. The AOV was very successful in the 1994 elections but disappeared four years later.

Party History
The AOV was founded on December 1, 1993. The direct cause for the formation of the AOV were budget cuts on retirement homes. During the 1994 election campaign one of the governing parties, the CDA, announced that it would cut government pensions. This made the AOV very attractive to the elderly. During the campaign the party organized several successful mass protests against budget cuts. The party won six seats. The Union 55+, another party aiming to represent the elderly, also won one seat.

In the autumn of 1994 a conflict developed in the party between Nijpels and the party's founder Batenburg. This results in a split within the parliamentary party and the party board. After the split there was no party in parliament which was allowed to call itself AOV by the presidium. In the 1995 Senate election, the party won two seats, one of which was taken by Batenburg, who immediately became an independent. In 1998 the party's sole senator joined the CDA. In the elections of the same year the AOV formed a new party, the Elderly Union (Ouderenunie), whilst Batenburg also participated in the election as the New Solidary Elderly Alliance. All were unable to win a seat.

Ideology & Issues
The party was a typical one issue party: it sought to better the position of the elderly, by increasing government pensions.

Representation
This table the AOV's results in elections to the House of Representatives, Senate and States-Provincial, as well as the party's political leadership: the fractievoorzitter, is the chair of the parliamentary party and the lijsttrekker is the party's top candidate in the general election, these posts are normally taken by the party's leader.

*: Split from the party after 1995.
**: estimates of the number of members elected on combined AOV/Unie 55+ lists.

Municipal and Provincial Government
In several provincial and local legislatures elderly parties, sometimes officially linked to the AOV, held seats.

In the period 1995-1999 the party had its own parliamentary parties with one or two seats in provincial legislatures in Limburg, Zeeland, Utrecht, Overijssel, Friesland and Groningen. In the other six provinces it ran a joint list with Unie 55+ which won more seats. In North Brabant this party had 5 seats out of 79. In the period 1999-2003 the party had representatives in only four provinces all in combined AOV/Unie 55+ parties.

In Eindhoven the party was particularly successful - in the 1994 municipal elections the party, led by Jet Nijpels, won a considerable number of seats and participated in the local executive.

Electorate
The party was supported by elderly, especially by former CDA-voters from the Southern provinces, North Brabant and Limburg.

International Comparison
The party can be compared to other suddenly successful elderly parties, like the Israeli Gil, but unlike that party, the AOV did not participate in government.

Pensioners' parties
Populism in the Netherlands
Defunct political parties in the Netherlands
Political parties established in 1993
Political parties disestablished in 1998
1993 establishments in the Netherlands